Miss République Démocratique du Congo or Miss Democratic Republic of the Congo (Formerly known as Miss Zaire) is a national Beauty pageant in Congo.

History
Miss DRC began in 1968. The pageant was known as Miss Zaire until 1997. The pageant was sponsored by Ministry of Tourism in Kinshasa. The country has competed in the Miss Universe, Miss World, and Miss International competitions. Since 2009, the country does not exist to compete due to lack of funding and sponsorship.

In 2016 Miss RD Congo Organization set new feature between Ministère du Tourisme, Pygma Communication as the production company. The pageant sets to be a reality TV show.

In December 2019, the Minister of Tourism announced the return of the Miss Congo (DRC) competition, the winner should be elected from December 2019 to September 2020.

Titleholders

 Miss Universe Congo (RDC)
 Miss World Congo (RDC)
 Miss International Congo (RDC)  

The winner of Miss Congo (DRC) might compete at the Miss Universe, Miss World or other competitions. It depends on National pageant franchise holder to appoint the winner as official representative of the country. Three queen of Miss République Démocratique du Congo received the highest achievement at Miss Universe; 1972 Ombayi Mukuta (Miss Congeniality), 1985 Kayonga "Benita" Mureka Tete (Second Runner-up) and 1986 Aimée Likobe Dobala (Top 10).

See also
Miss Congo (RC)

References

External links
missrdcongo
Miss RD Congo - YouTube Channel

Democratic Republic of the Congo
Democratic Republic of the Congo
Democratic Republic of the Congo
Recurring events established in 1968